Canadaphididae is an extinct insect family in the aphid superfamily (Aphidoidea), of the order Hemiptera.

References

External links

†
Prehistoric insect families
Extinct Hemiptera